Dabur Research Foundation (DRF) is an Indian contract research organization offering pre-clinical services in drug discovery and development. It was established in 1979 to spearhead the research and development activities of Dabur, India's largest Ayurvedic medicine manufacturer.

References

 Articles about International Finance Corporation – Economic Times
 BioSpectrumIndia – the business of biotech – Customer relationships in a competitive market
 Elephant Capital buys stake in ClinTec Intl for Rs 58 cr
 Cosmetics testing kills 3.9 million animals - BioSpectrum Asia
 Burmans plan Rs 925-crore healthcare fund
 Dabur to re-expand its pharma research

Review of Literature

External links
 Official website

Ayurvedic organisations
Pharmaceutical companies of India
Ghaziabad, Uttar Pradesh
Medical research in India
Pharmaceutical companies established in 1979
Science and technology in Uttar Pradesh
Dabur Group